Separation, a film produced in 1967 and released in 1968, was written by and starred Jane Arden and directed by Jack Bond.

Plot

The film explores the life of a middle-aged woman following the breakdown of her marriage.

Cast
 Jane Arden as Jane 
 David de Keyser as Husband 
 Ann Lynn as Woman 
 Iain Quarrier as Lover 
 Terence De Marney as Old man

Production

It features on its soundtrack music by Stanley Myers, one song ("Salad Days") by the British rock group Procol Harum and instrumental music by Procol's original Hammond organist Matthew Fisher. In addition to Jane Arden the film stars the British actors David de Keyser and Iain Quarrier.

Restoration

Separation, which was photographed in black and white with colour sequences, was restored by the British Film Institute for DVD and Blu-ray Disc and released in the UK on 13 July 2009. Another edition of the DVD, with a different cover photo and music credits for Procol Harum on the front cover and for Stanley Myers, Procol Harum and Matthew Fisher on the back cover, was released in the US in March, 2010. Separation was released on DVD in the U.S. for the first time on 30 March 2010 by Microcinema.

References

External links
 
 Review and report from the screening of the remastered version at the British Film Institute, 14 July 2009.

1968 films
Films directed by Jack Bond
Films scored by Stanley Myers
British drama films
1960s English-language films
1960s British films